Huara is a genus of South Pacific intertidal spiders first described by Raymond Robert Forster in 1964.

Species
 it contains twelve species, all found in New Zealand:
Huara antarctica (Berland, 1931) – New Zealand (Auckland Is.)
Huara chapmanae Forster & Wilton, 1973 – New Zealand
Huara decorata Forster & Wilton, 1973 – New Zealand
Huara dolosa Forster & Wilton, 1973 – New Zealand
Huara grossa Forster, 1964 – New Zealand (Auckland Is.)
Huara hastata Forster & Wilton, 1973 – New Zealand
Huara inflata Forster & Wilton, 1973 – New Zealand
Huara kikkawa Forster & Wilton, 1973 – New Zealand
Huara marplesi Forster & Wilton, 1973 – New Zealand
Huara mura Forster & Wilton, 1973 – New Zealand
Huara ovalis (Hogg, 1909) – New Zealand (Snares Is.)
Huara pudica Forster & Wilton, 1973 – New Zealand

References

External links 

Desidae
Spiders of New Zealand
Araneomorphae genera
Taxa named by Raymond Robert Forster